Saint-Véran ([ˈsã vˈʀã]) is a commune in the Hautes-Alpes department in southeastern France in the Queyras Regional Natural Park.

Geography
Saint-Véran, located in the French Alps, is the most elevated commune in France and in Europe. It is the third highest village in Europe, after Trepalle in Italy and Juf in Switzerland.

The permanent population is around 300 but swells with tourists in both summer and winter. In addition to tourism the main activities are agriculture and woodcraft.

Climate
Saint-Véran has a humid continental climate (Köppen climate classification Dfb).

Name
The village is named after Saint Véran, 6th century Bishop of Cavaillon who in legend drove away a dragon.

The Observatoire de Saint-Véran was constructed nearby by the Observatoire de Paris in the early 1970s.

Population

See also
Communes of the Hautes-Alpes department

References

External links

 Tourism Office website

Communes of Hautes-Alpes
Plus Beaux Villages de France